Llavandera is a parish of the municipality of Gijón, in Asturias, Spain.

The population of Llavandera was 356 in 2012.

It borders the districts of Fano in the east, Vega in the north, Samartín de Güerces in the west and the municipality of Siero in the south.

Villages and their neighbourhoods
La Bovia
El Vallín
El Xironte
Llavandera
La Rotella
Llinares
El Costanciu
La Sierra
La Torre
Los Vallinos
El Monte
Les Cabañes
Tueya
El Caleyu
El Cascayu
El Cotarón
Los Ñavalinos
El Peñéu
El Riundu

External links
 Official Toponyms - Principality of Asturias website.
 Official Toponyms: Laws - BOPA Nº 229 - Martes, 3 de octubre de 2006 & DECRETO 105/2006, de 20 de septiembre, por el que se determinan los topónimos oficiales del concejo de Gijón.

Parishes in Gijón